Edgar George Papworth Jnr (25 June 1832 – 20 January 1927) was an English sculptor. He came from a family long connected with stonework, his father being the sculptor Edgar George Papworth Senior (1809–66), and his grandfather Thomas Papworth (1773–1814), a stuccoist. He was popular in the later nineteenth century. He showed more than fifty portrait busts at the Royal Academy between 1852 and 1882.

In 1870, Papworth was chosen to make a statue of the Birmingham industrialist Josiah Mason, but Mason vetoed the proposal, and Papworth was paid 150 guineas in compensation. Eventually, a statue of Mason was created posthumously, by Francis John Williamson.

Papworth's work then fell out of fashion, and he was not mentioned in a list of English sculptors compiled in 1901.

References 

English sculptors
1832 births
1927 deaths